Na Moon-hee (Na Kyung-ja, ; November 30, 1941) is a South Korean actress. Since 1960, Na has had a prolific acting career in television and film spanning more than five decades. She established a classic Korean mother persona with her TV dramas Even if the Wind Blows, The Most Beautiful Goodbye in the World (written by Noh Hee-kyung), My Name is Kim Sam-soon, My Rosy Life, Goodbye Solo, Amnok River Flows (based on Der Yalu fließt), and It's Me, Grandma. On the big screen, Na has received acclaim for her roles in Crying Fist, You Are My Sunshine, Cruel Winter Blues and I Can Speak. Her critically acclaimed film I Can Speak (2017) won her the Best Actress trophy in three prestigious award ceremonies: 54th Baeksang Arts Awards, 38th Blue Dragon Film Awards and 55th Grand Bell Awards — a feat that has yet to be repeated.

After a series of comic roles in sitcoms such as Unstoppable High Kick!, the veteran actress garnered newfound popularity and played the title character in big screen comedy Mission Possible: Kidnapping Granny K, followed by starring roles in Girl Scout, Harmony, Twilight Gangsters, and Miss Granny.

She received a Lifetime Achievement Award from MBC in 2010, and the prestigious Bo-gwan Order of Cultural Merit in 2012.

Personal life
Na is married and has three daughters.

Filmography

Film

Television series

Taxi Driver (SBS, 2021)
Navillera (tvN, 2021)
Rain or Shine (JTBC, 2017)
Dear My Friends (tvN, 2016)
The Three Witches (SBS, 2015)
Glorious Day (SBS, 2014)
Wang's Family (KBS2, 2013)
Mom is Acting Up (MBC, 2012) 
The Sons (MBC, 2012–2013) 
Five Fingers (SBS, 2012)
Padam Padam (jTBC, 2011–2012) 
I Believe in Love (KBS2, 2011)
It's Me, Grandma (MBC, 2010)
Happiness in the Wind (KBS1, 2010)
Amnok River Flows (SBS, 2008)
Worlds Within (KBS2, 2008) 
My Precious You (KBS2, 2008–2009)
Woman of Matchless Beauty, Park Jung-geum (2008)
Kimcheed Radish Cubes (MBC, 2007–2008) 
Several Questions That Make Us Happy (KBS2, 2007)
Unstoppable High Kick! (MBC, 2006–2007) 
Famous Chil Princesses (KBS2, 2006) 
Goodbye Solo (KBS2, 2006) 
My Rosy Life (KBS2, 2005)
My Name is Kim Sam-soon (MBC, 2005) 
Precious Family (KBS2, 2004–2005)
Love is All Around (MBC, 2004)
Dog Bowl (SBS, 2004)
People of the Water Flower Village (MBC, 2004)
Apgujeong House (SBS, 2003–2004)
While You Were Dreaming (MBC, 2003)
The Maengs' Golden Era (MBC, 2002–2003) 
The Woman (SBS, 2002)
You Are My World  (SBS, 2002)
Sangdo (MBC, 2001–2002)
Tender Hearts (KBS1, 2001)
MBC Best Theater "My Fiancee's Story" (MBC, 2001)
Mothers and Sisters (MBC, 2000)
Mr. Duke (MBC, 2000)
You Don't Know My Mind (MBC, 1999–2000)
Did We Really Love? (MBC, 1999)
Last War (MBC, 1999)
Beautiful Secret (KBS2, 1999)
House Above the Waves (SBS, 1999)
As We Live Our Lives (KBS1, 1998)
The Reason I Live (MBC, 1997)
Because I Love You (SBS, 1997)
Brothers (KBS1, 1997)
The Most Beautiful Goodbye in the World (MBC, 1996) 
Im Kkeok-jung (SBS, 1996–1997)
Open Your Heart (MBC, 1996)
Mom's Flag (SBS, 1996)
Thief (SBS, 1996)
찬품단자 (MBC, 1995)
Even if the Wind Blows (KBS1, 1995–1996)
인연이란 (KBS1, 1995)
The Moon of Seoul (MBC, 1994)
MBC Best Theater "순달씨와 병구씨와 옥주양" (MBC, 1993)
친애하는 기타 여러분 (SBS, 1993)
Hope (MBC, 1993)
City People (MBC, 1991)
Another's Happiness (MBC, 1991)
나의 어머니 (MBC, 1990)
별난 가족 별난 학교 (MBC, 1990)
당추동 사람들 (KBS2, 1990)
유산 (MBC, 1989)
Three Women (MBC, 1989)
First Love (MBC, 1986)
The Seaside Village (MBC, 1985)
Love and Truth (MBC, 1984–1985)
The Stars Are My Stars (MBC, 1983)
못 잊어 (MBC, 1983)
Market People (MBC, 1983)
Annyeong haseyo (Hello) (MBC, 1981)
Mom, I Like Dad (MBC, 1979)
X 수색대 (MBC, 1978)
주인 (MBC, 1978)
Arirang Oh! (MBC, 1977)
Girls' High School Days (MBC, 1976–1977)

Television shows

Theater
'night, Mother (2008) 
Mother (1996)

Awards and nominations

References

External links
 Official website 
 
 
 

20th-century South Korean actresses
21st-century South Korean actresses
South Korean television actresses
South Korean film actresses
1941 births
Actresses from Beijing
Living people
Naju Na clan
South Korean Buddhists
Best Actress Paeksang Arts Award (film) winners